Euoestrophasia is a genus of flies in the family Tachinidae.

Species
Euoestrophasia aperta (Brauer & von Bergenstamm, 1889)
Euoestrophasia crosskeyi Guimarães, 1977
Euoestrophasia guatemalensis Guimarães, 1977
Euoestrophasia panamensis Guimarães, 1977
Euoestrophasia plaumanni Guimarães, 1977
Euoestrophasia portoriquensis Guimarães, 1977
Euoestrophasia townsendi Guimarães, 1977

References

Dexiinae
Tachinidae genera
Diptera of North America
Diptera of South America
Taxa named by Charles Henry Tyler Townsend